A beehive house is a building made from a circle of stones topped with a domed roof. The name comes from the similarity in shape to a straw beehive.

Occurrences

 
The ancient Bantu used this type of house, which was made with mud, poles, and cow dung. Early European settlers in the Karoo region of South Africa built similar structures known as corbelled houses. These white-washed structures are described as coursed rubble on a circular plan, with each successive course smaller and slightly corbelled over the course below so that a conical shape is achieved as each course is completed.

Beehive houses are some of the oldest known structures in Ireland and Scotland, dating from as far back as around 2000 BC. Bee houses have also been built in the Italian peninsula, with some still being built as late as the 19th century in Apulia (south-eastern Italy). In Southern Italy, these houses are called trulli while its prehistoric Sardinian versions were referred to as nuraghi.

A town called Harran in Turkey is also the location of houses that mimic the beehive architecture and they are still in existence today. The structures, which are clustered together like a termite colony, were said to have been constructed as windowless cones because it is the only way to achieve a roof without timber.

See also
 Beehive tomb
 Clochán, Irish stone huts, often beehive shaped
 Dovecote also called doocot (Scots), buildings to house doves, some are beehive shaped, stone structures
 Musgum mud huts, huts of the Musgum people in Cameroon
 Nuraghe, large, round, neolithic, stone structures in Sardinia
 Trullo, a southern Italian and northern Israel type of beehive house

References

External links
 

House types
Vernacular architecture
Roofing materials